Samit Bhanja (2 January 1944 – 24 July 2003) was an Indian actor and director known for his work in the Bengali cinema.

He joined Rupkar, the theatre group of Sabitabrata Dutta and enacted in several plays in early 1960s. He made his screen debut with Balai Sen's 1965 Bengali film Surer Agun. He is remembered as the male lead, Navin, of the successful Hindi film Guddi, opposite Jaya Bhaduri. In addition to acting in film, he acted in theatre and jatras, and was associated with the Rupkar group theatre. He died in Kolkata at the age of 59.

Selected filmography

 Surer Agun (1965)
 Hatey Bazarey (1967)
 Apanjan (1968) - Chheno
 Pratham Kadam Phool (1969) - Bhajahari Manna
 Parineeta (1969 film) - Girin
 Natun Pata (1969)
 Banajyotsana (1969)
 Aranyer Din Ratri (1970) - Hari
 Rupasi (1970) - Balaram
 Guddi (1971) - Navin (as Samit)
 Janani (1971)
 Atattar Din Pare (1971)
 Pratham Pratishruty (1971) - Rasbihari
 Ajker Nayak (1972)
 Sesh Parba (1972)
 Sapath Nilam (1972)
 Jaban (1972)
 Picnic (1972)
 Achena Atithi (1973)
 Wahi Raat Wahi Aawaz (1973)
 Chithi (1973) - Prasenjit Roy
 Fuleswari (1974)
 Fuleswari (1974)
 Asati (1974)
 Anjane Mehman (1975)
 Salaam Memsaab (1975)
 Kitne Paas Kitne Door (1976)
 Harmonium (1976) - Ratan
 Jiban Marur Prante (1976)
 Datta (1976) - Bilashbihari
 Bilwamangal (1976)
 Ek Bindu Sukh (1977)
 Kabita (1977)
 Golap Bou (1977)
 Mrigayaa (1977) - Rebel
 Shaanaai (1977) - Haradhan
 Striker (1978)
 Ganadevata (1979) - Aniruddha
 Sabuj Dwiper Raja (1979) - Raja Roychowdhury - Kakababu
 Bono Basar (1979)
 Dadar Kirti (1980) - Anil (as Samit Bhuiyan)
 Parabesh (1980)
 Upalabdhi (1981)
 Shahar Theke Dooray (1981) - Doctor Chatterjee
 Kalankini Kankabati (1981)
 Faisala (1982)
 Rajbabhu (1982)
 Amrita Kumbher Sandhaney (1982)
 Uttar Meleni (1982)
 Rajbadhu (1982)
 Faisala (1982)
 Prayashchitta (1983)
 Rajeshwari (1983)
 Abhinoy Noy (1983)
 Didi (1984)
 Debigarjan (1984)
 Jiban Sathi (1985)
 Dui Adhyay (1986)
 Urbashi (1986)
 Phera (1988)
 Sudhu Tomari (1988)
 Jar Jey Priyo (1989)
 Jhankar (1989)
 Asha-o-Bhalobasha (1989)
 Garmil (1990)
 Raktalekha (1992)
 Surer Bhubane (1992)
 JUYA (1992)
 Sarbojaya (1994)
 DAGI (1994)
 Bonophool (1994)
 Mohini (1995)
 Drishti (1995)
 Protidhwani (1995)
 Abar Aranye (2003) - Harinath Dutta aka Hari (final film role)

References

External links
 
 Samit Bhanja on Cinestaan
 Samit Bhanja on Moviebuff
 Actor Samit Bhanja's birthday remembered (Bengali)

Indian male film actors
Male actors in Bengali cinema
2003 deaths
1944 births
St. Paul's Cathedral Mission College alumni
University of Calcutta alumni